Lawrence Charles Weiner (February 10, 1942December 2, 2021) was an American conceptual artist. He was one of the central figures in the formation of conceptual art in the 1960s. His work often took the form of typographic texts, a form of word art.

Early life and career 
Lawrence Charles Weiner was born on February 10, 1942, in Manhattan, to Toba (Horowitz) and Harold Weiner. His parents owned a candy store. After graduating from Stuyvesant High School at 16,

Weiner began his career as an artist as a very young man at the height of Abstract Expressionism. His debut public work/exhibition was at the age of 19, with what he called Cratering Piece. An action piece, the work consisted of explosives set to ignite simultaneously in the four corners of a field in Marin County, California. That work, as Weiner later developed his practice as a painter, became an epiphany for the turning point in his career. His work in the early 1960s included six years of making explosions in the landscape of California to create craters as individual sculptures.  Weiner's early body of work is also known for his having created gestures described in simple statements leading to the ambiguity of whether the artwork was the gesture or the statement describing the gesture: e.g."Two minutes of spray paint directly on the floor.." or " A 36" x 36" removal of lathing or support wall ..." (both 1968). In 1968, when Sol LeWitt came up with his Paragraphs on Conceptual Art, Weiner formulated his "Declaration of Intent" (1968):

 
Weiner created his first book Statements in 1968, a small 64-page paperback with texts describing projects. Published by The Louis Kellner Foundation and Seth Siegelaub, "Statements" is considered one of the seminal conceptual artist's books of the era. He was a contributor to the famous Xeroxbook also published by Seth Siegelaub in 1968. Weiner's composed texts describe process, structure, and material, and though Weiner's work is almost exclusively language-based, he regarded his practice as sculpture, citing the elements described in the texts as his materials.

An important aspect of audience participation in Weiner's work is site-specificity. In SOME LIMESTONE SOME SANDSTONE ENCLOSED FOR SOME REASON (1993) he recast the iron weighbridge of the Dean Clough carpet factory, incorporating the words of the title as an embossing inscription.

From the early 1970s on wall installations have been Weiner's primary medium, and he has shown at the Leo Castelli gallery. Nevertheless, Weiner works in a wide variety of media, including video, film, books, sound art using audio tape, sculpture, performance art, installation art, and graphic art. In 2007, he participated at the symposium "Personal Structures Time-Space-Existence" a project which was initiated by the artist Rene Rietmeyer. In 2008 an excerpt from his opera with composer Peter Gordon – The Society Architect Ponders the Golden Gate Bridge – was issued on the compilation album Crosstalk: American Speech Music (Bridge Records) produced by Mendi + Keith Obadike. In 2009 he participated in the art project Find Me, by Gema Alava, in company of artists Robert Ryman, Merrill Wagner, and Paul Kos.

Exhibitions

A comprehensive retrospective of Weiner's nearly 50-year career was organized by Ann Goldstein and Donna De Salvo at the Museum of Contemporary Art, Los Angeles (MOCA) and the Whitney Museum of American Art, New York in 2007–2008. Major solo exhibitions of the artist's work have been mounted at the Stedelijk Museum Amsterdam (1988/89), Hirshhorn Museum and Sculpture Garden, Washington, D.C. (1990), Institute of Contemporary Arts, London (1991), Dia Center for the Arts, New York (1991), Musée d'Art Contemporain, Bordeaux (1991/92), San Francisco Museum of Modern Art (1992), The Arnhem (Sonsbeek) The Netherlands (1993) Walker Art Center, Minneapolis (1994), Philadelphia Museum of Art (1994), Museum Ludwig, Cologne (1995), Deutsche Guggenheim in Berlin (2000), Museo Tamayo Arte Contemporáneo in Mexico City (2004), Tate Gallery in London (2006), The Jewish Museum, NY (2012), Kunsthaus Bregenz, Austria (2016), and the Nivola Museum, Orani, Italy (2019). He participated in Documenta V (1972), VI (1977), and VII (1982), as well as the 2005 Venice Biennale, the Biennale de São Paulo in 2006, and the Venice Biennale and European Cultural Centre in 2013 with his work 'The Grace of a Gesture'.

Select list
 October 10 – December 20, 2015, WITHIN A REALM OF DISTANCE: Lawrence Weiner at Blenheim Palace at Blenheim Art Foundation, Oxfordshire
 October 25, 2014 – April 19, 2015 Straight Down to Below: Lawrence Weiner (part of Artist Rooms on Tour at Tate Modern and National Galleries of Scotland), Woodhorn Museum, Northumberland, Scotland
 September 26, 2014 – November 23, 2014, Lawrence Weiner: All in due course at South London Gallery, London
 September 21, 2013 – January 5, 2014 – Lawrence Weiner: written in the wind, Stedelijk Museum, Amsterdam 
 2013 – MACBA Museu d'Art Contemporani de Barcelona
 March 1 – May 13, 2012, Lawrence Weiner: NO TREE NO BRANCH at The Jewish Museum, New York
 May 19 – June 19, 2010, Lawrence Weiner in the House of Art, České Budějovice, Czech Republic
 May 27 – July 19, 2008, Lawrence Weiner: Water in Milk Exists at Kino Mascotte, Basel
 November 15, 2007 – February 10, 2008, Lawrence Weiner: As Far The Eye Can See at the Whitney Museum of American Art, New York
 March 22 – December 9, 2007, Lawrence Weiner: Inherent in the Rhumb Line at National Maritime Museum, Greenwich, England
 April 22 - November, 2022, THE LANGUAGE OF LAWRENCE WEINER at the Arsenale Institute for Politics of Representation, Venice, Italy

Recognition
Among his many honors were National Endowment for the Arts Fellowships (1976 and 1983), a Guggenheim Fellowship (1994), Wolfgang Hahn Prize (1995), a Skowhegan Medal for Painting/Conceptual Art (1999), An Honorary Doctorate of Humane Letters from the Graduate Center, City University of New York City, (2013), the Roswitha Haftmann Prize, Zurich, Switzerland (2015), and the Aspen Award for Art (2017). On the occasion of the Drawing Center's 2012 Spring Gala, where Weiner was being honored for his contributions to contemporary art, fellow artist Ed Ruscha and Mason Williams created a three-minute tribute in the form of a parody of Bob Dylan's legendary music video for "Subterranean Homesick Blues" with placards featuring Weiner text pieces like "stars don't stand still in the sky" and "water in milk exists."

Books 
 2010 :  Skimming The Water – Menage A Quatre - Lawrence Weiner (Personal Structures Art Projects Number 01)
 2012 : GREEN AS WELL AS BLUE AS WELL AS RED. Brest: Zédélé éditions, Reprint Collection. (First edition : London: Jack Wendler, 1972.)

Personal life 
Weiner and his wife Alice lived on Bleecker Street for over thirty years before moving to another residence and studio also in the West Village, in what was once an old laundromat built in 1910 and was transformed into a five-level town house designed by the firm LOT-EK in 2008.

Weiner died on December 2, 2021, in Manhattan, at the age of 79.

References

Bibliography
 Beate Reifenscheid und Dorothea van der Koelen; Arte in Movimento – Kunst in Bewegung, Dokumente unserer Zeit XXXIV; Chorus-Verlag; Mainz 2011; 
 Alberro, Alexander; Zimmerman, Alice; Buchloch, Benjamin H.D. and Batchelor, David. Lawrence Weiner. London: Phaidon Press, 1998.
 De Salvo, Donna and Goldstein, Ann (eds.) Lawrence Weiner: As Far as the Eye Can See. New York: Whitney Museum of American Art, Los Angeles: Museum of Contemporary Art, 2007.
 Fietzek, Gerti and Stemmrich, Gregor. (eds.) Having Been Said: Writings & Interviews of Lawrence Weiner 1968–2003. Ostfildern-Ruit: Hatje Cantz, 2004.
 Schwarz, Dieter (ed.) Lawrence Weiner: Books 1968–1989. Köln / Villeurbanne: Verlag der Buchhandlung Walther König / Le Nouveau Musée, 1989.

Notes

External links

Work for the Abbey of Corbigny, "Au pays"
Guggenheim bio page
Lisson Gallery
Lawrence Weiner in the Video Data Bank
 

1942 births
2021 deaths
American conceptual artists
People from the Bronx
Jewish American artists
Artists from the Bronx
Wolf Prize in Arts laureates
21st-century American Jews
Hunter College alumni
20th-century American Jews
Stuyvesant High School alumni